Henry Rolle, 1st Baron Rolle (7 November 1708 – 17 August 1750) of Stevenstone, Devon, was a British landowner and politician.

Origins
Rolle was the eldest son of John Rolle (1679–1730), Member of Parliament for Devon (who had declined the offer of an earldom by Queen Anne) by his wife Isabella Walter, daughter of Sir William Walter, 2nd Baronet, of Saresden, Oxfordshire. His younger brother John Rolle Walter assumed the surname of Walter on succeeding to the estates of his maternal uncle and also represented Devon in Parliament.

Career
Rolle succeeded his father as Member of Parliament for Devon on the latter's death in 1730, and held the seat until 1741. From 1741 to 1748 he represented Barnstaple in Parliament. In 1748 he was raised to the peerage as Baron Rolle of Stevenstone, in the County of Devon, and his vacated seat at Barnstaple was won by his first cousin Sir Bourchier Wrey, 6th Baronet (c. 1715–1784), of Tawstock, Devon.

Death and succession
Lord Rolle died unmarried in August 1750, aged 41, when the barony became extinct. His estates devolved on his youngest brother Denys III Rolle (1725–1797), the father of John Rolle, 1st Baron Rolle, in whose favour the barony was recreated in 1796.

Lands held
In 1731 Henry Rolle obtained the following inspeximus from King George II which effectively confirmed his title in part of his inheritance, namely various grants made by King Henry VIII to Sir Thomas Denys of Holcombe Burnell:
Inspeximus (at the request of Henry Rolle of Stevenstone), of a grant of Henry VIII (11 February. 31 Henry VIII), to Thomas Denys of Holcombe Burnell, Knt. for £1,127.3s.4d., of the Manors of Litlam alias Littelham and Exmouthe belonging to the late Monastery of Shirbourne, Dorset, in as full manner as the last Abbot held the same; also the messuage formerly in the tenure of Katherine Lytton in the parish of St. Peter-the-Less, in the ward of Beynardes Castell in London; which messuage lately belonged to the late Monastery of Croxden, Staffs and is worth 26s.8d. per year. Also the hundred of Budlegh alias East Budleigh which came to the King's hands by the attainder of Henry Courteney, late Marquis of Exeter. To hold by the following yearly rent, viz; for the Manors of Litlam and Exmouth, £6. 3s. 10d. for the messuage in London, 2s. 8d., the hundred of East Budleigh to be held by the 20th part of a Knight's fee without any rent.
East Budleigh and Bicton had been inherited by the Rolles by marriage to the Denys heiress.

Sources
Matthews, Shirley, biography of Henry Rolle (1708-50) published in History of Parliament: House of Commons 1715-1754, ed. R. Sedgwick, 1970

References

1708 births
1750 deaths
Barons in the Peerage of Great Britain
Peers of Great Britain created by George II
Henry
Members of the Parliament of Great Britain for Barnstaple
British MPs 1734–1741
British MPs 1741–1747
Members of the Parliament of Great Britain for Devon